Caesioperca is a genus of ray-finned fish in the sub-family Anthiinae in the sea bass family Serranidae. It contains just two species, found in the ocean off Southern Australia and New Zealand.

Species
Caesioperca lepidoptera (Forster, 1801) (Butterfly perch)
Caesioperca rasor (Richardson, 1839) (Barber perch)

References

 
Taxa named by François-Louis Laporte, comte de Castelnau
Anthiinae
Marine fish genera